Eka Gurtskaia (born c. 1986)  is a Georgian beauty pageant titleholder who represented her country in the 2011 Miss Universe pageant.

Miss Georgia 2010
Gurtskaia, who stands , competed as one of 23 finalists in her country's national beauty pageant, Miss Georgia, held in Batumi on 20 September 2010, when she gained the right to represent her nation in Miss Universe 2011.

Miss Universe 2011
As the official representative of Georgia to the 2011 Miss Universe pageant, broadcast live from São Paulo, Brazil on 12 September 2011, Gurtskaia will vie to succeed current Miss Universe titleholder, Ximena Navarrete of Mexico.

References

External links
Official Miss Georgia website

1986 births
Living people
Beauty pageant winners from Georgia (country)
Miss Universe 2011 contestants
Models from Tbilisi
Female models from Georgia (country)